QFE is a three letter acronym which can have meanings in aviation, in software development, and in network usage. It can refer to
QFE, a Q code used by pilots and air traffic controllers that refers to atmospheric pressure and altimeter settings
Quick Fix Engineering, also known as "hotfix".
Quoted for emphasis, used on internet forums when someone wants to reiterate a previously-made point.
Qualifying Financial Entities, are companies or organisations that are registered on the Financial Service Providers Register in New Zealand.